Kano was an Italo disco music project formed in Milan, Italy in 1979 by producers/musicians Luciano Ninzatti, Stefano Pulga and Matteo Bonsanto.

History
Kano's debut single was the 1980 international hit "I'm Ready", combining elements of 1970s disco, funk and R&B while extensively using synthesizers and percussive handclaps as well as raw-processed and vocoderized vocals. Kano's self-titled debut album also included "It's a War", "Ahjia", "Now Baby Now" and the instrumental track "Cosmic Voyager". "I'm Ready" peaked at No. 21 on the U.S. Black Singles chart, while "It's a War" and "Ahjia" were also hits on the Hot Dance Music/Club Play chart in the U.S., reaching No. 2 for five weeks.

The project went on to record two other albums, including 1981's New York Cake (which included the minor hits "She's a Star", "Don't Try to Stop Me" and "Can't Hold Back") and 1983's Another Life (including the title track and "I Need Love"). Both albums introduced Kano listeners to West Indian-born singer Glen White. Their last song was 1985's "This Is the Night".

Sampling and usage in media 

"I'm Ready" was later sampled on several songs, such as Gigolo Tony's 1986 hit "Hoki Poki" and Rofo's 1983 hit "Flashlight on a Disconight". The most well-known use of it as a sample is on Tag Team's 1993 hit, "Whoomp! (There It Is)". "Now Baby Now" was sampled by house artist Felix Da Housecat for his track "Glitz Rock" which appeared on the 2001 album Kittenz and Thee Glitz. "Another Life" was remixed by Master Blaster which features on their 2003 album We Love Italo Disco. "Another Life" was also sampled in the 2005 track "Discopolis" by Lifelike & Kris Menace. "Ikeya Seki" was sampled by French electro house artist Kavinsky for his track "Grand Canyon", which appeared on his 2007 EP, 1986. Finnish rapper Petri Nygård sampled "Ahjia" on his 2009 song "Kotibileet". An arpeggio from "Another Life" was sampled in the 2011 single "Reaching Out" by Nero.

"I'm Ready" was used as an intro/outro theme in the TV interstitial TV PIXxxx on WPIX-TV Channel 11, New York City.

Discography

Albums
Studio albums

Compilation albums

Singles

References 
[ Kano > Billboard Singles] at Allmusic. Retrieved on August 15, 2009
[ Kano > Billboard Albums] at Allmusic. Retrieved on August 15, 2009

External links 
 Kano at Discogs.com

Italo disco groups
Musical groups from Milan
Musical groups established in 1979